Janina is the third album of Puerto Rican singer, Janina, who became known after winning the first season of talent-reality show Objetivo Fama. The self-titled album was released on November 23, 2009.

Track listing
"Mi Enfermedad" - 3:18		
"Fantasma (Alone)" - 3:55		
"Jack Veneno" - 2:59		
"Ya No Mas" - 4:01		
"Otro Momento Casual" - 3:30		
"Tengo Suerte (Unbroken)" - 3:35		
"Amarte Es Morir" - 3:43		
"Me Toca A Mi (Te Toca A Ti)" - 3:14		
"Circulo Vicioso" - 3:54		
"Todo Lo Hago Por Ti" - 3:45

Singles
"Ya No Mas" - (January 27, 2009 | Main version) - (May 19, 2009 | Remixes)
"Fantasma" - (September 15, 2009)

References

2009 albums